The Citadel of Nehbandan, or Arg e Nehbandan, is a citadel from the Parthian era, located in Nehbandan in South Khorasan province of Iran.

Not much remains of the structure due to numerous earthquakes. The citadel is thought to have been possibly built even before the Parthian era according to some indications. To be for sure, its circular plan (300 meters in diameter) at least puts it firmly within the Parthian age.

The structure was occupied primarily for military purposes, and was used until as late as the Safavid era.

See also
List of Iranian castles
Iranian architecture

Buildings and structures completed in the 3rd century BC
Architecture in Iran
Castles in Iran
Buildings and structures in South Khorasan Province

National works of Iran